Literary Arabic may refer to:

 Classical Arabic
 Modern Standard Arabic